A matriarch or clan-mother or 'chief' is a mother, or other female person in a family who rules a clan or kinship.

Matriarch may also refer to:
 Matriarch (novel), by Karen Traviss
 Matriarch (album), by Veil of Maya
 Matriarch Records, an American record label owned by Mary J. Blige
 The Matriarch, a 2007 film directed by Markku Pölönen
 "Matriarch", a song by Arca from Sheep, 2015

See also
 Matriarchs (disambiguation)
 Matriarchal religion